Jean-Pascal Fontaine (born 11 September 1989) is a French professional footballer who plays as a midfielder.

Career
Fontaine was born in Saint-Louis, Réunion. In July 2002, he joined Le Havre from JS Saint-Pierroise. He played his first game for Le Havre against Nantes on 20 August 2007.

Fontaine left Le Havre after 20 years at the club at the end of the 2021–22 season.

Honours
Le Havre
 Ligue 2: 2007–08

References

External links
 
 
 
 

1989 births
Living people
Association football midfielders
French footballers
France under-21 international footballers
Footballers from Réunion
Le Havre AC players
JS Saint-Pierroise players
AS Beauvais Oise players
Ligue 2 players